AKS Lytham (AKS), or ArnoldKEQMS, is an independent, co-educational day school located on the Fylde, Lancashire, England. It was formed from the merger of King Edward VII and Queen Mary School (KEQMS) in Lytham St. Annes and Arnold School in Blackpool. It is based on a coastal 35-acre site in Lytham St Annes. AKS Lytham is a member of HMC and a part of the United Church Schools Trust family of schools. AKS is a member of the Round Square group of schools, a network in 50 countries. The school also provides a Beach Schools programme which uses the beaches in Lytham.

AKS Lytham hosts lectures by the Lytham St Annes Classical Association, a branch of the Classical Association.

The school was branded as "ArnoldKEQMS" from 2012 to 2014, and is currently known as "AKS Lytham".

The Merger 
AKS Lytham was formed, immediately, from the merger of two schools; King Edward VII and Queen Mary School (KEQMS) and Arnold School. In 2000, KEQMS was formed from the merger of King Edward VII School, Lytham and Queen Mary School, meaning that AKS Lytham is entirely formed of four schools. The school's alumni association (OAKS) acknowledges this avidly and offers a range of support from business networks, webinars and career programmes to community and social events regularly for members of each four of the previous schools.

During early 2011, it was announced that KEQMS and Arnold School were to merge, without consultation of the staff, parents and pupils. This sparked local outrage in both Lytham St. Annes and Blackpool, as well as protesting from parents, alumni and students, controversy and allegations of fraudulent behaviour from both school's governors. Numerous Facebook campaign groups were created in response to the news of the amalgamation which were soon populated by stakeholders from both sides. It was announced that the merged school would be based at the Clifton Drive South campus, previously operated by KEQMS, which further angered the parents of Arnold School. The location difference from Arnold Avenue to the new site is roughly 5 miles.

Both schools were amalgamated and introduced as a new member of the United Church Schools Trust (UCST), which was met with opposition due to the lack of consultation with key stakeholders. The identities of those who govern and run UCST, described as "a board of trustees" and "an executive team", was subject to mass criticism, as KEQMS had previously been governed by local individuals who were well-known to pupils and parents alike. The new set of governors had not yet been to the KEQMS school grounds, this was seen as a travesty to many involved, as the new board had never even been to their new school. Arnold School was previously a member of UCST, therefore sparking less outrage from their parents.

Alumni and parent-led debates and protests took place, both internally within the schools, as well as externally on the school grounds. A KEQMS parent group led the objections submitted to the Charity Commission, prompting a review. The Charity Commission completed their report and announced on 11 November 2011 that they had approved the decision. The parent group immediately announced their intention to appeal against the Charity Commission decision. Fylde M.P. Mark Menzies became involved in the heated controversy surrounding the proposed take-over of the school.

The protesting parents wanted a ballot over the proposed merger, which saw the imminent departure of the KEQMS principal Mr. Robert Karling, an increase in fees and the school population more than double. An area of uncertainty for staff was the security of their teaching positions. Both Arnold and KEQMS teachers were originally unsure of their future positions. A new staff list became clear and many were unhappy with results, with Arnold School staff populating more positions than KEQMS staff.

"Hands off our school" was a headline printed by the Lytham St Annes Express during the protesting period. An online petition containing more than 1,000 signatures opposing the merger was presented to governors in advance of a series of meetings over the move. During the September protests, governors’ chairman Canon Godfrey Hirst, admitted that initially, he had "perhaps underestimated" the strength of public feeling against the merger. "I thought the main objections would be from Arnold parents over moving here," he said, "I will take their petition to the governing body and I will listen to the proposals that a small group of parents wish to discuss with me."

Much of the blame was directed at the current governors, for allowing this to happen without any prior warning. Governors at KEQMS condemned reactions from parents and alumni, saying they were "deeply disturbed by the degree of personal animosity and guile" levelled at the then chairman of governors Canon Godfrey Hirst, who subsequently resigned as a result.

In November 2011, the then Arnold School headteacher, Mr. Jim Keefe, had bleach thrown in his face in an attack thought to be linked to his involvement in the controversial school merger. Mr. Keefe was attacked with the substance on a November morning when he opened the door of his home, which was close to the school grounds. The headteacher was taken to hospital but released the same day and took part in a police investigation. All involved condemned the act and no arrests were made as a result.

An appeal was lodged with HM Courts and Tribunal Service – First Tier Tribunal on Friday 9 December 2011. The tribunal's decision was made on 17 May 2012 and stated that the merger could proceed, however the lease agreement put the charity assets at undue risk and needed to be re-written. The parents group then announced that they were not going to appeal and the merger therefore proceeded.

After many months of unrest, the merger was confirmed. These included a move to the KEQMS campus, a £9m investment to improve facilities, a new uniform and schools colours, a new motto and increased tuition fees. Following a year of transition in 2012-2013, where AKS operated on each respective campus, the school relocated fully from September 2013 on the refurbished and extended Lytham campus with Mr. Jim Keefe at the helm.

Facilities and grounds

The AKS Lytham campus boasts a 35-acre coastal location, an extensive site with large playing fields, as well as an international standard artificial all weather sports ground. The school allows for external hire of their facilities, as advertised on their website.

From the announcement of the merger in 2011 until late 2014, £9m was invested in the school grounds, facilities and classrooms by UCST. The improvements made included an entirely new sports hall, gymnasium and sports department, which was built upon the previous external sports hall. They also included: refurbished Sixth Form facilities; new staff and administrative facilities; a new Library; new ICT facilities; new D&T facilities; upgraded and new science laboratories; a new drama studio; upgraded music facilities; improvements to internal accessibility; extended art facilities; and interactive whiteboards in each classroom. All of these improvements were made to cater for an almost doubled population size due to the amalgamation of the schools. The school hall has a 300 capacity, with stage, sound and lighting rigs installed for in-school events and productions.

The school's campus caters for ages 2–18, with a nursery, preparatory school, senior school and sixth form department.

In May 2017, the school unveiled the new "Pavilion Café", a rebuild and redesign of the cricket pavilion changing rooms. The new Café was built on the edge of the school cricket pitch, allowing parents and pupils to view the games whilst indoors. The funding was provided by: Lytham Schools Foundation; the Arnold School Development Fund; AKS PTA; Old Arnoldians (for the two Pavilion clocks); and the Sri Lanka Cricket Tour Parents’ Committee (for the new scoreboard). The Café is now open everyday and at most school sporting events for use by all.

Headmasters

During the school merger of 2011-2012, it was announced that Mr. Jim Keefe, headmaster of Arnold from 2010, would take the helm of the newly formed AKS Lytham, leaving KEQMS Headmaster Mr. Robert Karling to step down. 

Mr. Keefe announced of his appointment at the helm of St John’s Ravencourt School in Winnipeg within months of him successfully seeing through the highly-controversial merger. During his short tenure, the school's colours began to move from green and blue to burgundy, and the school's logo changed slightly. Mr Keefe remained in post until July 2014 and local governing body chairman Jerry Wooding said in a letter to parents ‘a rigorous national recruitment process’ will take place to find his successor.

It was announced that Mr. Mike Walton was to succeed Mr. Keefe as headmaster, and he took charge from September 2014. Mr. Walton graduated from Lancaster University and had worked in state and independent schools for 30 years. Prior to AKS, he had been Headmaster of schools in both the UK and, for nine years prior, in Thailand. Mr. Walton was also elected in leadership positions on the boards of a number of prestigious international educational organisations:

 Chairman of the Federation of British International Schools in Asia – Trustee for Round Square
 Director for East Asia and Australasia. Chair of the Accreditation Committee for the International Schools
 Association of Thailand, advising the Ministry of Education.

Mr. Walton led the school successfully into 2014, with a group of new staff joining with him. "Academic ambition, individual pathways, success and value" were introduced as the three core principles of the school's aims. A new school crest was also introduced. Mr. Walton was well received and stayed in his post until the summer of 2019.

In early 2019, Mr. Walton announced that he would be returning to Thailand. His new post saw him heading up the prestigious Brighton College in Bangkok.

In April 2019, news broke that Mr. David Harrow would succeed Mr. Walton as headteacher at AKS. Mr Harrow was deputy head at Oakham School, a co-educational day and boarding school in Rutland. David graduated from St Catharine’s College at the University of Cambridge with a master's degree in Mathematics and has worked in independent education for over 20 years. Prior to joining AKS, he was the Deputy Head (Academic) at Oakham School and has worked as a Head of Department, a badminton coach, a pastoral tutor to generations of students, as well as serving as an ISI inspector.

In an article published by the Lancashire Evening Post ("New head for top Lancashire school"), Mr. Chris Dickson, chairman of governors at AKS said Mr Harrow's appointment followed an extensive recruitment process. He added: "Throughout the recruitment process, Mr Harrow stood out from a field of excellent candidates with his vision for the future of AKS in building on its strong academic record and our focus on developing the whole child." The soon to be new head said: "The kind of education I want for my own children is one in which they can develop as individuals, exploring their own abilities and identifying their particular passions, becoming confident, rounded people ready to face the challenges and opportunities in the world to come. So many schools claim to offer this, of course, but I was struck by how this actually manifests at AKS. It is an incredibly exciting school, offering a rich, experiential and life-enhancing education, all within a friendly, supportive and inclusive community."

Mr. Harrow took over from September 2019, and is currently headmaster, as of Autumn 2022.

Achievements 
AKS Lytham has a reputation for high standards and excellence in achievement, both academic and non-academic, as well as encouraging participation within an inclusive and caring community environment. Hockey has triumphed at national level, while rugby and drama also hold prestigious awards, and music has an international reputation. Sports teams tour in the UK, Europe and the Southern Hemisphere, and a large number of pupils participate in the Duke of Edinburgh Award Scheme at bronze, silver and gold level. The school also has a large Combined Cadet Force (CCF). The school has a thriving House structure, and charity features prominently in school actions, both in support of local needs as well as international needs.

An excerpt from the school prospectus states, "It is our aim to educate our pupils within a caring school community, guiding each individual to develop and grow into a knowledgeable and successful young adult with the skills, character and personality both to lead and to serve."

A list of achievements and statistics, included in the AKS Lytham prospectuses:

 Almost half of students go to Russell Group or top 10 universities.
 There is a 65% participation rate in the Duke of Edinburgh Award Scheme, with almost 200 pupils involved.
 3-year average statistics show: 61% of GCSE grades at 9-7.
 3-year average statistics show: 56% of A Level grades at A* or A, with 81% at A* - B. 2021: 66% of all A Level grades were A* or A, with 87% at A* - B.
 The best independent school in the UK for catering and hospitality (2018).
 25 girls gained county honours for Hockey (2018/19 season).
 4 active alumni networks with 3,500 members.
 35% of students play a musical instrument or perform in an ensemble.
 100% of students gained distinctions in LAMDA examinations (May 2019).
 AKS have topped the Tycoon in Schools (Peter Jones Foundation) national leaderboard for 4 years in a row.
 12 sports have been represented at national level by AKS students.
 Every child from years 3-6 plays a musical instrument.

School Crest 
The AKS school crest was introduced in 2017, after years of deliberation as to whether to school would have one. The decision was made to incorporate the previous coats of arms from all three merged schools, rather than to create a new one. The three previous schools mottos were removed, these included:

 King Edward VII School - Sublimis Ab Unda, which is Latin for 'raised from the waves', in reference to the fact the school was funded by the 1719 flood disaster.
 Queen Mary School - Semper Fidelis, Semper Parata, which translates to 'Always Faithful, Always Prepared'.
 Arnold School - Honor Virtutis Praemium, which translates to 'Honour is the reward of virtue'.
Both King Edward School and Queen Mary School shared a coat of arms, which then became the KEQMS crest after their 1999 merger. This crest contained Excalibur rising from the ocean, in reference to the King Edward School 1719 flood disaster, as well as a marigold, which grew abundantly on the site of Queen Mary School and a shell representing the seaside position.

The Arnold School coat of arms was granted in 1999. The shield contained three red roses of Lancashire on a silver field between wedges of Arnold green. Their crest was a red rose between two laurel leaves (for scholarship), standing on silver and blue waves (for Blackpool).

The new crest incorporated all of the above elements in silver and burgundy. It is now used on uniforms and all school properties.

References

Schools in the Borough of Fylde
Private schools in Lancashire
United Learning schools
Member schools of the Headmasters' and Headmistresses' Conference